The East Hartford Velodrome was a velodrome in East Hartford, Connecticut. In its three-year lifespan, it hosted football and boxing events before it was demolished in 1929.

The Hartford Blues played their 1926 and 1927 seasons at the velodrome, a then-new bicycle track located across the Connecticut River in East Hartford. The grass football field barely fit inside the wooden track. Its capacity was 8,000 spectators.

Football
The Velodrome was the home for the National Football League's Hartford Blues for their 1926 and 1927 seasons.

Boxing
The Velodrome has hosted many boxing events. One event was main evented by Connecticut's own Christopher "Battling" Battalino, when he defeated Archie Rosenberg by knock-out.

|-
! Date
! Winner
! Loser
! Type
! Rd., Time
! Attendance
! Ref.
|- align="center"
| June 6, 1928 || Battling Battalino || Archie Rosenberg || KO || - || - || 
|- align="center"
| September 23, 1929 || Battling Battalino || André Routis || PTS || 15 || - || 
|- align="center"
| August 18, 1930 || Battling Battalino || Bud Taylor || PTS || 10 || - || 
|- align="center"
| September 24, 1930 || Kid Kaplan || Battling Battalino || PTS || 10 || - || 
|- align="center"
| September 15, 1931 || Battling Battalino || Eddie Shea || PTS || - || - || 
|}

References

See also

East Hartford Velodrome
Defunct National Football League venues
Defunct sports venues in Connecticut
Demolished sports venues in Connecticut
Hartford Blues
Sports venues completed in 1926
Sports venues in Hartford County, Connecticut